Liia is an Estonian feminine given name. As of 1 January 2020, 1,114 women in Estonia have the first name Liia, making it the 169th most popular female name in the country. The name is most commonly found in Saare County. Individuals bearing the name Liia include:

Liia Hänni (born 1946), astrophysicist, social activist and politician
Liia Kanemägi-Jõerand (born 1974), actress 
Liia Leetmaa (1924–2004), ballet dancer and dance teacher
Liia Lüdig (born 1950), painter

References

Feminine given names
Estonian feminine given names